Brandiston is a small village and civil parish near the centre of the county of Norfolk, England, about two miles south-east of the small market town of Reepham, five miles south-west of the larger town of Aylsham and 10 miles north-west of the city of Norwich. For the purposes of local government, it falls within Broadland district. The hamlet of Guton lies within the parish.

Geography
The 2001 census recorded a population for Brandiston of just 44. The bulk of the parish is occupied by farmland, mainly arable. At the 2011 Census the population less than 100 and was included in the civil parish of Booton.

History
Brandiston's name is of Anglo-Saxon origin and derives from the Old English for Brant's farmstead or settlement.

In the Domesday Book, Brandiston is described as a settlement of four households, with the village belonging to William the Conqueror.

Brandiston is one of Norfolk's remaining 124 round-tower churches, which date from before the Norman Conquest. St Nicholas' Church was significantly re-modelled in the late Fourteenth Century and, again, in 1844 by Edward Blore at the request of the local Athill family. Today, the church is not in frequent use and is maintained by the Churches Conservation Trust.

In the 1850s, four almshouses were built for the benefit of the parishioners. These were funded by the generous donations of a William Gurney almost three-hundred years earlier.

During the Second World War, Brandiston was home to RAF Swannington. Throughout the war, Brandiston was home to the Hurricanes of No. 85 Squadron RAF and the Mosquitos of No. 157 Squadron RAF. The aircraft fell into disuse after the war and was eventually sold in 1957, mostly returning to agricultural use.

Places of Interest
There is a small common in the west of the parish, surrounded by cottages that were originally built to house labourers for Guton Hall and The Grove in Booton.

The remains of a stump cross are on the eastern boundary of the parish, on the Cawston-Norwich road.

War Memorial
St. Nicholas' Church holds a marble plaque commemorating the deaths of the two sons of the parish rector during the First World War. They are listed as:
 Lieutenant Preston A. A. Enright (1899-1918), No. 22 Squadron, Royal Flying Corps
 Second-Lieutenant Anthony B. Enright (1896-1917), 17th Brigade Royal Field Artillery

References

Broadland
Villages in Norfolk
Civil parishes in Norfolk